Yaal Blazers is a franchise cricket team based in Kurunegala, Sri Lanka.

History
The team first took part in the 2013 Super 4's T20 was named as Uthura Yellows. After losing two games out of three, the team was eliminated. In 2014 the team was renamed as the Yaal Blazers

Squad

Dinesh Chandimal (C)
Akila Dananjaya
Alankara Asanka
Anuk Fernando
Ashan Priyanjan
Chamara Kapugedera
Chaminda Bandara
Chathuranga Kumara
Dushmantha Chameera
Jeevan Mendis
Mahela Jayawardene
Mahela Udawatte
Ramith Rambukwella
Rangana Herath
Rumesh Buddika
Sahan Wijeratne
S Sanjeewan 
Shaminda Eranga
Shehan Fernando
Thisara Perera

See also
2014 Super 4's T20
Sri Lanka Cricket

References

2014 in cricket
Kurunegala
Former senior cricket clubs of Sri Lanka